Gregor MacGregor (31 August 1869 – 20 August 1919) was a former Scotland international cricketer and Scotland international rugby union player. He also played for the England international cricket team.

Personal history
MacGregor was born in 1869 to Donald MacGregor J.P. of Argyll in Edinburgh, Scotland. He was schooled at Uppingham before matriculating to Jesus College, Cambridge in October 1887. On leaving university he found work on the London Stock Exchange.

Cricket career

Club career

In cricket he played 265 first-class matches between 1888 and 1907.   He made his first-class debut for Cambridge University against C.I. Thornton's XI at Fenner's in 1888 and won Blues in all four years at Cambridge.  He made first-class appearances for a number of teams, including Middlesex as a wicket keeper and captained the county club between 1898 and 1907. He later served as the treasurer, before his death in 1919, aged 49.

International career

He played for Scotland against Australia.

He played in eight Tests for England.

He is commemorated at Cambridge, as the first Scottish cricket Blue to play international cricket, in the Hone-MacGregor Trophy: a triangular tournament between Cambridge University, Irish Universities and Scottish Universities.

Rugby Union career

Amateur career

MacGregor played club rugby for Cambridge University. In 1889 and 1890 he appeared as full back for Cambridge University against Oxford, showing himself a fine tackler and very accurate kick. In the same season that he first appeared for Cambridge, he was also awarded his first international cap.

He then played for London Scottish.

Provincial career

He played for West of Scotland District against East of Scotland District on 24 January 1891.

He was selected for Middlesex to play against Yorkshire in the 1893 English County Championship. Five Scots were selected for Middlesex: Gregor MacGregor, George Campbell, William Wotherspoon, Robert MacMillan and Frederick Goodhue, all with London Scottish who played in the county. He played in that match, but Yorkshire won and then secured the championship.

Also in that Middlesex side were the Wales international player Arthur Gould and the England international player Andrew Stoddart alongside the Scotland internationals named.

International career

He played for Scotland between 1890 and 1896. MacGregor was selected by the Scottish Rugby Union to appear for Scotland in all three international matches of the 1890 Home Nations Championship.

In 1890, MacGregor was invited to join William Percy Carpmael's newly formed touring team, the Barbarians. He accepted and became an original member of the team.

MacGregor also played in the Home Nations Championship in 1891 and 1893, missing the 1892 tournament as he was out in Australia with Lord Sheffield's cricket team in 1892, and in 1894 he played against England and Wales. His final appearance in an international game being between Scotland and England, decided at Hampden Park, Glasgow, in 1896. Although he began and finished his career in matches as a full back, MacGregor played mostly in those games as a centre three-quarter—those when the three three-quarter system was preferred.

Writing career

MacGregor also wrote about rugby. For example, he contributed a chapter titled "Full Back Play" to a book by Bertram Fletcher Robinson, Rugby Football (London: The Isthmian Library, 1896).  This book was recently republished in facsimile form.

Legacy

A portrait painted by Henry Weigall Jr, of Andrew Stoddart batting and MacGregor keeping wicket, was given to the MCC in 1927 by W.H. Patterson, a MCC committee member.  The identity of the artist of the oil painting was only reaffirmed in 2018.  The picture regularly hangs in the Pavilion at Lord's.

See also

List of Scottish cricket and rugby union players
List of Test cricketers born in non-Test playing nations

References

External links

Wisden Cricketers' Almanack obituary

Godwin, Terry Complete Who's Who of International Rugby (Cassell, 1987)
Gregor MacGregor on scrum dot com

1869 births
1919 deaths
19th-century British businesspeople
Alumni of Jesus College, Cambridge
Barbarian F.C. players
C. I. Thornton's XI cricketers
Cambridge University cricketers

Cricketers from Edinburgh
England cricket team selectors
England Test cricketers
Gentlemen cricketers
Gentlemen of England cricketers
Lord Londesborough's XI cricketers
Lyric Club cricketers
Married v Single cricketers
Marylebone Cricket Club cricketers
Middlesex cricket captains
Middlesex cricketers
North v South cricketers
Oxford and Cambridge Universities Past and Present cricketers
People educated at Uppingham School
Scottish cricketers
Wisden Cricketers of the Year
Wicket-keepers
Scottish rugby union players
Rugby union players from Edinburgh
Scotland international rugby union players
Cambridge University R.U.F.C. players
Middlesex County RFU players
West of Scotland District (rugby union) players
London Scottish F.C. players